Gushki (also Romanized as Gūshkī and Gūshakī; also known as Bāgh Vaḩshī) is a village in Khanmirza Rural District, Khanmirza District, Lordegan County, Chaharmahal and Bakhtiari Province, Iran. At the 2006 census, its population was 373, in 77 families. The village is populated by Lurs.

References 

Populated places in Lordegan County
Luri settlements in Chaharmahal and Bakhtiari Province